Taytay is an impact crater in the Oxia Palus quadrangle of Mars, located at .37° N and 19.65° W. It is  in diameter and was named after the town of Taytay, Palawan in the Philippines.

See also 
 Impact event
 List of craters on Mars
 Ore resources on Mars
 Planetary nomenclature

References 

Oxia Palus quadrangle
Impact craters on Mars